Allotalanta is a genus of moths in the family Cosmopterigidae. It was first described by Edward Meyrick in 1913.

Species
 Allotalanta autophaea Meyrick, 1913 (Turkey, Taurus Mountains)
 Allotalanta clonomicta Meyrick, 1927 (South Africa, KwaZulu-Natal)
 Allotalanta crocomitra Meyrick, 1914 (India, Kanara)
 Allotalanta deceptrix Meyrick, 1925 (China, Liaoning)
 Allotalanta globulosa Meyrick, 1914 (Sri Lanka)
 Allotalanta lacteata Meyrick, 1914 (India, Coorg)
 Allotalanta ochthotoma Meyrick, 1930 (Cameroon)
 Allotalanta oporista Meyrick, 1926 (New Ireland)
 Allotalanta spilothyris Meyrick, 1922 (India, Assam)
 Allotalanta synclera (Meyrick, 1921) (India, Kanara)
 Allotalanta tephroclystis Meyrick, 1930 (Cameroon)

Former species
 Allotalanta triocellata (Stainton, 1859) (India)

References

Cosmopteriginae
Moth genera